Hotel Marinela Sofia is a 5-star hotel located in Lozenets, near downtown Sofia, Bulgaria. It was one of the most luxurious hotels in the capital of Bulgaria. With 442 guest rooms, 10 conference rooms, 4 restaurants, 2 bars and a nightclub. It also hosts the only Japanese garden in the Balkans.

The hotel was built as the Vitosha New Otani by the Japanese New Otani Hotels chain between 1974 and 1979 to the design of leading Japanese architect Kisho Kurokawa (1934–2007) in the upper-class neighbourhood Lozenets. In his design, Kurokawa implemented architectural details inspired by the Bulgarian National Revival style of Koprivshtitsa and Plovdiv. The 21-storey hotel was built by Bulgarian company Tehnoeksportstroy and the Japanese Mitsubishi. Its Japanese garden was a large-scale copy of the one at the original Hotel New Otani Tokyo and one of its main features is  a Japanese-style garden with a typical house and lake.

See also
List of tallest buildings in Sofia

References

External links
Official website 
Hotels in Sofia
Hotel buildings completed in 1979